Elections to Larne Borough Council were held on 19 May 1993 on the same day as the other Northern Irish local government elections. The election used three district electoral areas to elect a total of 15 councillors.

Election results

Note: "Votes" are the first preference votes.

Districts summary

|- class="unsortable" align="centre"
!rowspan=2 align="left"|Ward
! % 
!Cllrs
! % 
!Cllrs
! %
!Cllrs
! %
!Cllrs
!rowspan=2|TotalCllrs
|- class="unsortable" align="center"
!colspan=2 bgcolor="" | UUP
!colspan=2 bgcolor="" | DUP
!colspan=2 bgcolor="" | Alliance
!colspan=2 bgcolor="white"| Others
|-
|align="left"|Coast Road
|bgcolor="40BFF5"|38.1
|bgcolor="40BFF5"|2
|27.0
|1
|15.0
|1
|19.9
|1
|5
|-
|align="left"|Larne Lough
|bgcolor="40BFF5"|66.2
|bgcolor="40BFF5"|3
|27.2
|2
|0.0
|0
|6.6
|0
|5
|-
|align="left"|Larne Town
|bgcolor="40BFF5"|32.4
|bgcolor="40BFF5"|2
|28.2
|1
|12.4
|1
|27.0
|1
|5
|-
|- class="unsortable" class="sortbottom" style="background:#C9C9C9"
|align="left"| Total
|45.6
|7
|27.5
|4
|9.0
|2
|17.9
|2
|15
|-
|}

Districts results

Coast Road

1989: 2 x UUP, 1 x DUP, 1 x Alliance, 1 x Independent Nationalist
1993: 2 x UUP, 1 x DUP, 1 x Alliance, 1 x Independent Nationalist
1989-1993 Change: No change

Larne Lough

1989: 3 x UUP, 2 x DUP
1993: 3 x DUP, 2 x UUP
1989-1993 Change: No change

Larne Town

1989: 2 x UUP, 1 x DUP, 1 x Alliance, 1 x Independent
1993: 2 x UUP, 1 x DUP, 1 x Alliance, 1 x Independent Unionist
1989-1993 Change: Independent Unionist gain from Independent

References

Larne Borough Council elections
Larne